Orthosiphon is a genus of plants in the family Lamiaceae native to Africa, Southern Asia and Queensland, with one species (O. americanus) in Colombia. Some Orthosiphon species are popular garden plants because of their flowers, which are white and bluish with filaments resembling a cat's whiskers. In the wild, the plants can be seen growing in forests and along roadsides.

Common names in Southeast Asia are Misai Kucing (Malaysia), Kumis Kucing and Remujung (Indonesia), and Yaa Nuat Maeo (Thailand).

Species
 Orthosiphon adenocaulis A.J.Paton & Hedge - Madagascar
 Orthosiphon allenii (C.H.Wright) Codd - from Zaire +  Tanzania to Zimbabwe
 Orthosiphon americanus Harley & A.J.Paton - Colombia
 Orthosiphon argenteus A.J.Paton & Hedge - Madagascar
 Orthosiphon aristatus aka Orthosiphon stamineus (Blume) Miq. - China, Indian Subcontinent, Southeast Asia, Queensland; naturalized in Fiji
 Orthosiphon biflorus A.J.Paton & Hedge - Madagascar
 Orthosiphon bullosus Chiov. - Somalia
 Orthosiphon cladotrichos Gürke  - Tanzania
 Orthosiphon cuanzae (I.M.Johnst.) A.J.Paton - Angola
 Orthosiphon discolor A.J.Paton & Hedge - Madagascar
 Orthosiphon ellipticus A.J.Paton & Hedge - Madagascar
 Orthosiphon exilis A.J.Paton & Hedge - Madagascar
 Orthosiphon ferrugineus Balf.f. - Socotra
 Orthosiphon fruticosus Codd - Northern Province of South Africa
 Orthosiphon glandulosus C.E.C.Fisch - Assam, Ranong Province of southern Thailand
 Orthosiphon hanningtonii (Baker) A.J.Paton - Kenya, Tanzania
 Orthosiphon humbertii Danguy - Madagascar
 Orthosiphon incurvus Benth. in N.Wallich - Himalayas from Nepal to Myanmar
 Orthosiphon lanatus Doan ex Suddee & A.J.Paton - Vietnam
 Orthosiphon miserabilis A.J.Paton & Hedge - Madagascar
 Orthosiphon newtonii Briq. - Angola
 Orthosiphon nigripunctatus G.Taylor - Angola, Zambia
 Orthosiphon pallidus Royle ex Benth. - tropical + eastern Africa, Madagascar, Arabian Peninsula, India, Pakistan
 Orthosiphon parishii Prain - Myanmar, Thailand
 Orthosiphon parvifolius Vatke - Ethiopia, Tanzania, Kenya, Uganda
 Orthosiphon pseudoaristatus Suddee - Thailand
 Orthosiphon robustus Hook.f. - Assam
 Orthosiphon rotundifolius Doan ex Suddee & A.J.Paton - Thailand, Vietnam
 Orthosiphon ruber A.J.Paton & Hedge - Madagascar
 Orthosiphon rubicundus (D.Don) Benth. - southern China, Himalayas, Indochina
 Orthosiphon rufinervis G.Taylor - Angola, Zambia
 Orthosiphon sarmentosus A.J.Paton & Hedge - Madagascar
 Orthosiphon scapiger Benth.  - Himalayas
 Orthosiphon scedastophyllus A.J.Paton - Tanzania, Mozambique
 Orthosiphon schimperi Benth.  - tropical + southern Africa from Guinea to Somalia south to Transvaal
 Orthosiphon schliebenii A.J.Paton - Tanzania
 Orthosiphon thymiflorus (Roth) Sleesen - tropical Africa, Madagascar, Saudi Arabia, India, Sri Lanka, Indochina, Java
 †Orthosiphon truncatus Doan ex Suddee & A.J.Paton - Vietnam but believed to be extinct
 Orthosiphon vernalis Codd - Eswatini
 Orthosiphon violaceus Briq - Angola
 Orthosiphon wattii Prain - Assam
 Orthosiphon wulfenioides (Diels) Hand.-Mazz. - Guangxi, Guizhou, Sichuan, Yunnan

References

External links
 
 Java tea

 
Lamiaceae genera